Corey Johnson (born 16 November 2000) is an English professional rugby league footballer who plays as a  for Leeds Rhinos in the Betfred Super League.

Playing career

Leeds Rhinos
In 2019 he made professional debut on loan at Featherstone Rovers in the Betfred Championship and made his Super League début in Leeds' final home game of the 2019 season. Despite being less than two years into a four-year contract to stay at Leeds until 2022, Johnson was released from his contract in March 2020 announcing his retirement from the game to focus on life away from rugby league.

York RLFC (loan)
On 8 July 2021, it was reported that he had come out of retirement, re-signed for Leeds and then signed for York RLFC in the RFL Championship on loan.

Bradford Bulls (loan)
On 2 December 2021, it was reported that he had signed for Bradford in the RFL Championship on loan.

References

External links
Leeds Rhinos profile
SL profile

2000 births
Living people
Bradford Bulls players
English rugby league players
Featherstone Rovers players
Leeds Rhinos players
Rugby league hookers
Rugby league players from Yorkshire
York City Knights players